Feltus Wylie Sypher (December 12, 1905 – August 1987) was an American non-fiction writer and professor.

Sypher was born in Mount Kisco, New York to Harry Wylie Sypher and Martha Berry. He graduated from Amherst College in 1927. He received a master's degree from Tufts University in 1929 and became an instructor at Simmons College. That same year he married Lucy Johnston. In 1932, he received his second master's degree from Harvard University. He earned his Ph.D. in 1937 from Harvard.

Sypher taught summers at the University of Wisconsin, the University of Minnesota, and in the 1968 summer session he became the first Robert Frost Professor of Literature at the Bread Loaf School of English at Middlebury College, where he had taught since 1957. Professor Sypher was twice awarded a Guggenheim fellowship for research in the theory of fine arts and literature.

Throughout his life, Sypher wrote on the history of art and literature, sometimes combining both. Sypher viewed art history and criticism as the same thing.

He died in Hackettstown, New Jersey in 1987.

Works
Four Stages of Renaissance Style (1955)
Rococo to Cubism in Art and Literature (1960)
Loss of the Self in Modern Literature and Art (1962)
Literature and Technology: The Alien Vision (1968)
The Ethic of Time: Structures of Experience in Shakespeare (1976)
Art History: An Anthology of Modern Criticism (editor, 1963)

References

External links
 Wylie Sypher at the New York Review of Books.

1905 births
1987 deaths
Amherst College alumni
Tufts University alumni
Simmons University faculty
Harvard University alumni